Audrius Šlekys (2 April 1975 - 27 July 2003) was a Lithuanian football player.

Club career
Šlekys played for several clubs in his hometown Kaunas and had spells in Russia with Alania Vladikavkaz and Metallurg Lipetsk. In 2002 he topped the Lithuanian goalscoring charts with 19 goals FOR FBK Kaunas.

International career
He made his debut for Lithuania in a July 1996 friendly match against Belarus, his only international game.

Death
Šlekys was killed in a car accident in July 2003, after he lost control of his BMW near the village of Žiegždriai.

Honours
Individual
A Lyga top scorer: 2002 (19 goals)

Inkaras Kaunas
A Lyga champion: 1994–95, 1995–96
A Lyga bronze: 1996–97
Lithuanian Football Cup winner: 1995
Lithuanian Football Cup runner-up: 1996, 1997

Žalgiris Kaunas/FBK Kaunas
A Lyga champion: 1999, 2001, 2002, 2003
A Lyga bronze: 1998–99
Lithuanian Football Cup winner: 2002
Lithuanian Football Cup runner-up: 1999

References

External links

1975 births
2003 deaths
Sportspeople from Kaunas
Association football forwards
Lithuanian footballers
Lithuania international footballers
FBK Kaunas footballers
FK Inkaras Kaunas players
FC Spartak Vladikavkaz players
FC Metallurg Lipetsk players
Russian Premier League players
Lithuanian expatriate footballers
Expatriate footballers in Russia
Road incident deaths in Lithuania